Malek Ali Mouath Al-Hawsawi (also named Malek Maaz officially by FIFA ) (born 10 August 1981) is a Saudi Arabian former professional footballer.

Mouath originally played as an attacking midfielder but was converted into a striker after moving to Al Ahli.

He played for the Saudi Arabia national team and participated in the 2006 FIFA World Cup.

Club career

Early life
Mouath was born in Medina, Saudi Arabia in 1981, when he was a teenager. His soccer profession was discovered by Medina's soccer club, Al-Ansar and he officially played for Al-Ansar in the year 2000.

Al-Ahli 2004–2012
Al-Ahli management offered Mouath 700,000 US$ to move play for Al-Ahli. The new team changed Mouath's position from a midfielder to a striker, this step was the key of success and fame of the player. He was the greatest player Saudi Arabia of all time in 2006–2007, he also obtaining the Saudi Crown Prince Cup and Saudi Federation Cup in 2007 against Al-Ittihad. On 20 May 2008 Malek played Al-Nasr for farewell match by legendary Majed Abdullah against Real Madrid C.F., Malek scored 2 goals in 54 minutes and 90+1 minutes and they team won scores are 4–1. On 2 September 2011 he move to Al-Nasr Club as loan for one season only.

Al-Nasr (loan) 2011–2012
On the 2011–12 Saudi Professional League, Malek has played 16 appearances and made 3 goals.
after the end of tournament with Al-Nasr, Al-Ahli thinking about it if he need him or not in the next season, Al-Ahli decided to release his contract to promised dues. Mouath said I Will not be move to a weak team and I'm thinking the UAE Pro-League or retire. 
on 2012, Mouath announced to retire.

International career
Malek joined the Saudi national team in early 2006. During 2006 FIFA World Cup, Mouath used 23 as a squad number. Later, when Sami Al-Jaber, the former Saudi Arabia striker retired, the manager changed Mouath's number from 23 to 9.

He was chosen for the Saudi squad in 2006 FIFA World Cup and 2007 AFC Asian Cup. He was announced as the best player of the 2006/2007 season by Saudi Arabian Football Federation (SAFF).

During the 2007 AFC Asian Cup he helped Saudi Arabia progress to the final by scoring 2 goals in the semi-final against Japan. The final was subsequently lost to Iraq.

International goals

Honours

Al-Ahli (Jeddah)
Crown Prince Cup : 2007
Saudi Federation Cup : 2007
Gulf Club Champions Cup: 2008

National Team
2006 FIFA World Cup: Group Stage
2007 AFC Asian Cup: Runner up
2007 Gulf Cup of Nations: semi-finals
2009 Gulf Cup of Nations: Runner up

Individual
Best Player In Saudi Premier League: 2006–07

References 

1981 births
Living people
Saudi Arabian footballers
Saudi Arabian expatriate footballers
Saudi Arabia international footballers
2006 FIFA World Cup players
2007 AFC Asian Cup players
Association football forwards
People from Medina
Al-Ansar FC (Medina) players
Al-Ahli Saudi FC players
Al-Arabi SC (Qatar) players
Al Nassr FC players
Saudi First Division League players
Saudi Professional League players
Expatriate footballers in Qatar
Saudi Arabian expatriate sportspeople in Qatar